Hydriris is a genus of pyraloid moths in the tribe Hydririni of the subfamily Spilomelinae.

Species
Hydriris angustalis Snellen, 1895
Hydriris aonisalis (Walker, 1859)
Hydriris bornealis (C. Felder, R. Felder & Rogenhofer, 1875)
Hydriris chalybitis Meyrick, 1885
Hydriris ornatalis (Duponchel, 1832)

References

Spilomelinae
Crambidae genera
Taxa named by Edward Meyrick